Gennadius (Greek: Ἅγιος Γεννάδιος; d. 25 August 471) was the Patriarch of Constantinople from 458 until his death. Gennadius is known to have been a learned writer who followed the Antiochene school of literal exegesis, although few writings have been left about him. He is commemorated in the Eastern Orthodox Church on 17 November, but is not listed in the Roman Martyrology.

Biography
His first public writing was quoted by Facundus (Defensio, II, iv) against Cyril of Alexandria in two works, probably in 431 or 432, including a passage to show that his work was more violent even than the letter of Ibas. The Anathemas of Cyril and Two Books to Parthenius were criticized. In the latter he exclaims, "How many times have I heard blasphemies from Cyril of Egypt? Woe to the scourge of Alexandria!". In 433 Gennadius probably reconciled with Cyril. If Cyril's letter of 434 (Ep. lvi) is to the same Gennadius, they were friends in that year. Gennadius was a presbyter at Constantinople when he succeeded Anatolius in 458 as the Bishop of Constantinople. From the beginning of his episcopate Gennadius proved his zeal for the Christian faith and the maintenance of discipline. His discretion was before long tested.

Timothy Aelurus, the Monophysite who made himself the Patriarch of Alexandria and was later chased from the Patriarchate by order of the Roman emperor, had obtained leave to come to Constantinople, intending to re-establish himself on his throne. On 17 June 460, Pope Leo I warned Gennadius (Ep. clxx) against Timothy Aelurus, and urged him to prevent the voyage of Timothy and to secure the immediate consecration of an Orthodox Patriarch for Alexandria. Timothy Aelurus was banished to the Chersonese, and Timothy Solofaciolus was chosen bishop of Alexandria in his stead. About the same time, Gennadius' liberality and desire for order was observed in his appointment of Marcian, a Novatianist who had come over to the Orthodox church, the oeconomus of the goods of the church of Constantinople.

Two Egyptian solitaries told John Moschus a story which is also recorded by Theodorus Lector. The church of Saint Pope Eleutherius at Constantinople was served by a reader named Carisius, who led a disorderly life. Gennadius first reprimanded him and then had him flogged. When both measures proved ineffectual, the patriarch prayed to Eleutherius to either correct the unworthy reader or to take him from the world. Next day Carisius was found dead, to the terror of the whole town. Theodorus also relates how a painter, presuming to depict the Saviour under the form of Jupiter, had his hand withered, but was healed by the prayers of Gennadius.

About the same time Daniel the Stylite began to live on a column near Constantinople, apparently without the permission of the Patriarch or the owner of the property where the pillar stood, who strongly objected to this strange invasion of his land. The Emperor Leo protected the ascetic, and some time later sent Gennadius to ordain him priest, which he is said to have done standing at the foot of the column, because Daniel objected to being ordained and refused to let the bishop mount the ladder. At the end of the rite, however, the patriarch ascended to give Holy Communion to the stylite and to receive it from him. Whether he then imposed his hands on him is not said. Possibly he considered it sufficient to extend them from below towards Daniel. According to Theodorus Lector, Gennadius would allow no one to become a cleric unless he had learned the Psalter by heart.

Measures had been taken against simony, the buying and selling of holy orders, by the Council of Chalcedon. It seems not later than 459, Gennadius celebrated a great council of 81 bishops, many of whom were from the East and even from Egypt, including those who had been dispossessed of their sees by Timothy Aelurus. The letter of this council against simony is still preserved (J. D. Mansi, VII, 912). An encyclical was issued, adding anathema to the former sentence.

Gennadius died 25 August 471. He stands out as an able and successful administrator whom historians have roundly praised.

Biblical works
John Moschus said of Gennadius to have been very mild and of great purity. Gennadius of Marseilles said Gennadius was lingua nitidus et ingenio acer (of refined tongue and sharp intellect), and so rich in knowledge of the ancients that he composed a commentary on the whole Book of Daniel. The continuation of Jerome's Chronicle by Marcellinus Comes tells us (according to some manuscripts) that Gennadius commented on all epistles of Paul of Tarsus.

Gennadius wrote a commentary on Daniel and many other parts of Old Testament and on all the epistles of St. Paul, and a great number of homilies. Of these only a few fragments remain. The principal fragments of his biblical works include Genesis, Exodus, Psalms, Romans, 1 and 2 Corinthians, Galatians, and Hebrews, and are interesting specimens of 5th century exegesis. Some fragments are collected in Migne, Patrologia Graeca, LXXXV, chiefly from the two catenae of John Antony Cramer on Romans; a few passages are found in the catena of Aecumenius, others in the catenae of Nicephorus Callistus Xanthopulus, and a few in the Vienna MS. gr. 166 (46).

Gennadius is seen to have been a learned writer, who followed the Antiochene school of literal exegesis. Romans, a series of explanatory remarks on isolated texts, is his most significant work.

References

Attribution

Further reading

471 deaths
5th-century patriarchs of Constantinople